Juan Echavarría (born 28 January 1962) is a Colombian former archer. He competed in the men's individual event at the 1984 Summer Olympics.

References

External links
 

1962 births
Living people
Colombian male archers
Olympic archers of Colombia
Archers at the 1984 Summer Olympics
Place of birth missing (living people)
20th-century Colombian people
21st-century Colombian people